Allotinus leogoron is a butterfly in the family Lycaenidae. It was described by Hans Fruhstorfer in 1915. It is found in Asia.

Subspecies
Allotinus leogoron leogoron (Malay Peninsula, Sumatra, Bangka, Thailand)
Allotinus leogoron batuensis Eliot, 1967 (Batu Island)
Allotinus leogoron normani Eliot, 1967 (Borneo)
Allotinus leogoron plessis Eliot, 1967 (Java)

References

Butterflies described in 1915
Allotinus
Butterflies of Borneo